Dogani Béré (Dògàn-bɛ̀lɛ́) is a village and rural commune in the Cercle of Bandiagara of the Mopti Region of Mali. The commune contains five villages and at the time of the 2009 census had a population of 2400. The village cluster is called Dogani, while Dogani Béréw is the name of the main village. The other villages are Menthi, Kounde, Gobina, and Sirou.

Najamba-Kindige is spoken in the village. Local surnames are Sangalaba, Gaba, Ogolba, Molba, and Diombele.

References

External links
.

Communes of Mopti Region